The Prahova is a river of Southern Romania, which rises from the Bucegi Mountains, in the Southern Carpathians. It is a left tributary of the  Ialomița. It flows into the Ialomița in Dridu Snagov. The upper reach of the river, upstream of the confluence with the river Azuga is sometimes called the Prahovița.

Towns and villages

The following towns and villages are situated along the river Prahova, from source to mouth: Predeal, Azuga, Bușteni,, Poiana Țapului, Sinaia, Posada, Comarnic, Nistorești, Breaza, Cornu, Poiana Câmpina, Câmpina, Bănești, Bobolia, Cocorăștii Caplii, Cap Roșu, Novăcești, Florești, Călinești, Cătina, Filipeștii de Târg, Nedelea, Ariceștii Rahtivani, Ezeni, Zalhanaua, Stăncești, Piatra, Stejaru, Pisculești, Tinosu, Miroslăvești, Palanca, Independența, Belciug, Gherghița, Hătcărău, Tufani, Malamuc, Răsimnicea, Rădulești, Adâncata, Patru Frați.

Tributaries

The following rivers are tributaries to the river Prahova (from source to mouth):

Left: Puriștoaca, Valea Popii, Olăreasa, Pârâul lui Vlad, Ursoaia Mare, Ursoaia Mică, Azuga, Valea Mărului (I), Valea Seacă (I), Valea Fetei, Valea Seacă (II), Valea Măturarului, Zamora, Șipa, Tufa, Valea Cășăriei (I), Valea Rea, Valea Câinelui, Gagu, Valea lui Bogdan, Valea la Nuci, Valea Mărului (II), Valea Surpăturii, Valea Orății, Conciu, Florei, Câmpea, Doftana, Viișoara, Teleajen, Vitman, Cricovul Sărat
Right: Joița, Râșnoava, Pârâul Sec, Valea Brusturilor, Valea Stânei, Valea Grecului, Valea Fabricii, Valea Cerbului, Valea Albă, Paltinu, Valea Jepilor, Valea Seacă a Jepilor, Urlătoarea, Valea Babei, Piatra Arsă, Peleș, Valea Cășăriei (II), Valea Iancului, Zgarbura, Izvorul Dorului, Valea Largă, Dogăria, Valea Dracului, Valea Măgarului, Valea Seciului, Valea Obielei, Valea Mesteacănului, Valea Beliei, Viroaga, Poienari, Maia

References

Rivers of Romania
 
Rivers of Brașov County
Rivers of Prahova County
Rivers of Ialomița County